Dynów is a small town in Rzeszów County, Subcarpathian Voivodeship, Poland, with a population of 6,058 (02.06.2009).

History

Dynów was first mentioned in written sources in 1423. At that time, together with other villages, it belonged to the noble Kmita family from Lesser Poland. In 1409, after the death of Voivode of Kraków, Piotr Kmita, the village was handed to his son, Piotr Lunak, who died in 1430. Dynów was granted town charter probably before 1429. In 1448, it became seat of a Roman Catholic parish, but remained a small town, located in the Ruthenian Voivodeship (part of Red Ruthenia) of the Kingdom of Poland.

In March 1657, Dynów was captured by Transilvanian army of George II Rakoczi, which burned the town, together with its churches and castle. In 1661, Dynów was plundered again, this time by mercenaries of Mikolaj Ossolinski, who fought his private war with owner of Dynow, Olbracht Grochowski. In 1667, the town was purchased by Castellan of Przemyśl, Marcin Konstanty Krasicki.

Following the first partition of Poland (1772) Dynów was annexed by the Habsburg Empire, and remained in Austrian Galicia until 1918. In the second half of the 19th century, a brewery and a small oil refinery were opened here. Most of Dynów's residents were artisans, including masons, carpenters and weavers. In 1904, a narrow gauge rail line to Przeworsk was completed.

In 1785, the town had 2,203 inhabitants. Among them 67,5% were Polish, 26,8% Jewish and 5,4% Ukrainian. According to the 1921 census, the population of Dynów amounted to 2,727 – 51,3% Poles, 46,7% Jews and 2% Ukrainians.

After World War I, Dynów returned to newly restored Poland, and until 1939, belonged to Lwów Voivodeship. In 1919, it lost its town charter. On September 13, 1939, the village was captured by German 5th Infantry Division (see Invasion of Poland). During World War II, Dynów was an important center of the Home Army.

During the German Invasion of Poland in 1939, Wehrmacht soldiers on the first day of Jewish New Year (Rosh Hashanah) mass murdered 200 Jewish civilians from the town. 150 Jews were mass murdered by machine guns after being taken away from the town on trucks. 50 Jews were burned alive in their prayer house.

In 1946, Dynów regained its town charter.

People from Dynów 
 Jacob Adler (1874–1974), American Yiddish writer born in Dynów.
Yaroslav Halan (1902–1949), Ukrainian playwright and publicist.

Gallery

References
Notes

External links
 Official town website

Cities and towns in Podkarpackie Voivodeship
Rzeszów County
Ruthenian Voivodeship
Kingdom of Galicia and Lodomeria
Lwów Voivodeship
Shtetls
Holocaust locations in Poland